Echinopepon is a genus of flowering plants in the family Cucurbitaceae, native to the southwestern United States, Mexico, Central America, and South America. Tendrillate vines, their prickly fruits are operculate, with the prickles themselves being stipitate glandular.

Species
Currently accepted species include:

Echinopepon arachoideus (Dieterle) A.K.Monro & Stafford
Echinopepon belizensis A.K.Monro & Stafford
Echinopepon calcitrapa McVaugh
Echinopepon cirrhopedunculatus Rose
Echinopepon coulteri (A.Gray) Rose
Echinopepon disjunctus Pozner
Echinopepon glutinosus (Cogn.) A.K.Monro & Stafford
Echinopepon insularis S.Watson
Echinopepon jaliscanus Rose
Echinopepon longispinus (Cogn.) Rose
Echinopepon milleflorus Naudin
Echinopepon minimus (Kellogg) S.Watson
Echinopepon paniculatus (Cogn.) Dieterle
Echinopepon pringlei Rose
Echinopepon pubescens (Benth.) Rose
Echinopepon racemosus (Steud.) C.Jeffrey
Echinopepon rosei (Cogn.) H.Schaef. & S.S.Renner
Echinopepon torquatus (Moc. & Sessé ex DC.) Rose
Echinopepon tultitlanapaensis A.K.Monro & Stafford
Echinopepon wrightii (A.Gray) S.Watson

References

Cucurbitaceae genera